Alan Charles Ingram Lock (born 10 September 1962) is a former Zimbabwean international cricketer who played one Test match and eight One Day Internationals.

Lock had previously given over a  farm to the government for resettlement and had consequently received permission in 2003 to stay on a small parcel of land, Karori Farm. Lock brought a contempt of court application against the loss of his remaining land.

References

External links
 

1962 births
Living people
Sportspeople from Marondera
White Zimbabwean sportspeople
Zimbabwe Test cricketers
Zimbabwe One Day International cricketers
Zimbabwean cricketers
Mashonaland cricketers
Cricketers at the 1996 Cricket World Cup